Odrina Kaze (born 11 August 2000) is a Burundian swimmer. 

In 2018, she competed in the women's 50 metre freestyle and women's 100 metre freestyle events at the 2018 FINA World Swimming Championships (25 m) held in Hangzhou, China. In both events she did not advance to compete in the semi-finals.

She represented Burundi at the 2019 World Aquatics Championships held in Gwangju, South Korea. She competed in the women's 50 metre freestyle event. She did not advance to compete in the semi-finals. She also competed in the women's 50 metre breaststroke event. In the same year, she also represented Burundi at the 2019 African Games held in Rabat, Morocco.

In 2021, she competed in the women's 50 metre freestyle event at the 2020 Summer Olympics held in Tokyo, Japan.

References 

Living people
2000 births
Place of birth missing (living people)
Burundian female swimmers
Burundian female freestyle swimmers
Female breaststroke swimmers
African Games competitors for Burundi
Swimmers at the 2019 African Games
Olympic swimmers of Burundi
Swimmers at the 2020 Summer Olympics
21st-century Burundian people